Diachora is a genus of fungi in the family Phyllachoraceae.

Distribution
It is has been found in Europe and Asia.

Species
As accepted by Species Fungorum;
 Diachora erebia 
 Diachora fennica 
 Diachora lathyri 
 Diachora onobrychidis 

Former species;
 D. barnadesiae  = Phyllachora barnadesiae
 D. lespedezae  = Vitreostroma desmodii
 D. lessertiae  = Stigmatula sutherlandiae, Phyllachoraceae

References

External links
Index Fungorum

Sordariomycetes genera
Phyllachorales